De la fontaine, De Lafontaine or Delafontaine may refer to:

 Mademoiselle De Lafontaine, also known as La Fontaine, (1655–1738), French ballerina regarded as the first female professional ballet dancer

 Agathe de La Fontaine (born 1972), French actress
 Benoît Mottet de La Fontaine (1745–1820), French officer in the navy and colonies ministry
 Christophe de la Fontaine (born 1976), industrial designer working and living in Germany
 Edmond de la Fontaine (1823–1891), Luxembourgian jurist, poet, and lyricist
 Gaspard-Théodore-Ignace de la Fontaine (1787–1871), Luxembourgish politician and jurist
 Jacques de Lafontaine de Belcour (1704–1765), French entrepreneur involved in various business ventures in New France 
 Jean de La Fontaine (1621–1695), French fabulist and one of the most widely read French poets of the 17th century
 Léon de la Fontaine (1819–1892), Luxembourgish lawyer, politician and botanist
 Marc Delafontaine (1837–1911), Swiss chemist who in 1878, along with Jacques-Louis Soret, first observed holmium spectroscopically
 Nicholas de la Fontaine, Protestant refugee in Geneva and secretary of John Calvin
 Pierre-Maximilien Delafontaine (1777–1860), French painter
 Robert le Maçon, Sieur de la Fontaine (c. 1534–1611), French Reformed minister and diplomat.

See also
 De Lafontaine (1655–1738), French ballerina
 Del Fontaine (1904–1935), Canadian boxer
 Château de la Fontaine (disambiguation)
 La Fontaine (disambiguation)
 Lafontaine (disambiguation)